Gymnelia xanthogastra is a moth of the subfamily Arctiinae. It was described by Maximilian Perty in 1834. It is found in Rio de Janeiro, Brazil.

References

Gymnelia
Moths described in 1834
Taxa named by Maximilian Perty